Buna Independent School District is a public school district based in the community of Buna, Texas (USA).

In 2009, the school district was rated "academically acceptable" by the Texas Education Agency.

References

External links
Buna ISD

School districts in Jasper County, Texas